Edo Patregnani (1 May 1938 – 3 December 2013) was an Italian footballer who primarily played as a goalkeeper.

Patregnani died on 3 December 2013, aged 75, in Cento, Province of Ferrara, Italy.

References

1938 births
2013 deaths
People from Fano
Italian footballers
Association football goalkeepers
Sportspeople from the Province of Pesaro and Urbino
Footballers from Marche